Pedana railway station (station code:PAV), is an Indian Railways station in Pedana of Andhra Pradesh. It lies on the Gudivada–Machilipatnam branch line and is administered under Vijayawada railway division of South Coast Railway Zone..

Classification 
In terms of earnings and outward passengers handled, Pedana is categorized as a Non-Suburban Grade-5 (NSG-5) railway station. Based on the re–categorization of Indian Railway stations for the period of 2017–18 and 2022–23, an NSG–5 category station earns between – crore and handles  passengers.

References 

Railway stations in Guntur district
Railway stations in Vijayawada railway division